Conus norpothi is a species of sea snail, a marine gastropod mollusk, in the family Conidae, the cone snails and their allies.

Description
The length of the shell attains 35.3 mm.

Distribution
This marine species occurs off Cape Agulhas, South Africa.

References

Conus (Sciteconus) algoensis norpothi n. ssp., a new subspecies from Cape Agulhas, South Africa (Gastropoda: Conidae). Conchylia 45(1-3): 51-54

Endemic fauna of South Africa
Conidae